Oberea curticollis is a species of longhorn beetle in the tribe Saperdini in the genus Oberea, discovered by Pic in 1928.

References

C
Beetles described in 1928